The 1961 Wake Forest Demon Deacons football team was an American football team that represented Wake Forest University during the 1961 NCAA University Division football season. In its second season under head coach Bill Hildebrand, the team compiled a 4–6 record and finished in seventh place in the Atlantic Coast Conference (ACC).

Halfback Alan White was selected by the Associated Press as a first-team player on the 1961 All-Atlantic Coast Conference football team.

Schedule

Team leaders

References

Wake Forest
Wake Forest Demon Deacons football seasons
Wake Forest Demon Deacons football